The Warehouse Point railroad bridge is a girder bridge with a truss main span crossing the Connecticut River between Enfield and Suffield, Connecticut. It carries Amtrak's New Haven–Springfield Line. The bridge has spaces for two tracks, but only one is connected to the mainline. It is one of a few iron bridges erected in the United States before the end of the American Civil War.

History
A wooden Howe truss railroad bridge was originally constructed in 1843 at this site by the Hartford and Springfield Railroad Company. In 1865–66, a new bridge (designed by James Laurie) was constructed to replace the old one. The bridge was built in sections in England and shipped to the United States. The pieces were then riveted together on site. The bridge was rebuilt and double-tracked in 1903–04.

See also 
 List of crossings of the Connecticut River

References

General references 
 
 Manual for Railroad Engineers and Students (1881) - contains detailed description of the engineering specifications and construction of the bridge.

External links

Bridges over the Connecticut River
Railroad bridges in Connecticut
Enfield, Connecticut
Suffield, Connecticut
Bridges in Hartford County, Connecticut
Bridges completed in 1843
Bridges completed in 1866
Bridges completed in 1904
1843 establishments in Connecticut
Girder bridges in the United States
Truss bridges in the United States